Nils Wogram (born 7 November 1972) is a jazz trombonist, composer and bandleader. He began classical study at the age of fifteen. He was a member in the National German Youth Big Band, participated in classical competitions and formed his own bands at the age of 16. In 1992 he received a scholarship for the New School of New York City and stayed until 1994. During this time he released his debut album "New York Conversations" (1994) with his own Nils Wogram Quintett. Since then he has released more than 20 albums as a bandleader. In 1999 he graduated from Cologne University. In 2010 he started his own record label nwog-records. Nils Wogram's bands play exclusively his own music, and other ensembles commission pieces by him. He currently lives in Zürich and teaches at the conservatory in Lucerne in Switzerland.

Besides his own bands (see working bands), Nils Wogram was involved with other band projects. From 1994 to 2006 he played in the German Jazz Quintet Underkarl of double bass player Sebastian Gramss and was a member of the German Jazz-Rap Band Jazzkantine for several years. Nils Wogram played with Kenny Werner, Rudi Mahall, Eugene Chadbourne and today plays with the Aki Takase Quintet.

Discography 
1994 Nils Wogram Quintett, New York Conversations
1996 Nils Wogram Quartett, Roundtrip (enja)
1998 Nils Wogram Quartett, Speedlife (enja)
1999 Nils Wogram und Simon Nabatov, As we don’t know it (konnex records)
2000 Nils Wogram und Conny Bauer, Serious Fun (cimp)
2001 Nils Wogram Sextet / Oktett, Odd and Awkward (enja)
2001 Nils Wogram Quartett, Root 70 (mit Hayden Chisholm, Matt Penman, Jochen Rückert) (2nd floor)
2002 Xavier Garcia-Gianni Gebbia-Nils Wogram, pronto!
2002 Nils Wogram und Simon Nabatov, The Move (btl)
2002 Nils Wogram und Simon Nabatov, Starting A Story (act records)
2003 Underkarl, Second brain
2003 Nils Wogram Root 70, Getting Rooted (enja)
2003 Nils Wogram Quartett, Construction Field (altrisuoni)
2004 Nils Wogram Nostalgia Trio, Daddy's Bones (intuition)
2005 Nils Wogram Septett, Swing Moral
2005 Nils Wogram und Simon Nabatov, The move (between the lines)
2006 Nils Wogram Root 70, Fahrvergnügen (Intuition)
2007 Nils Wogram and the NDR Bigband, Portrait Of A Band (enja)
2007 Nils Wogram und Simon Nabatov, Jazz Limbo (leo records)
2008 Nils Wogram Nostalgia Trio, Affinity (intuition)
2008 Nils Wogram Root 70, On 52nd 1/4 Street (Intuition)
2009 Nils Wogram's Lush, Pretty Good News (unit records)
2010 Nils Wogram Root 70, Listen To Your Woman (nwog)
2011 Nils Wogram und Simon Nabatov, Moods And Modes (nwog)
2011 Nils Wogram Nostalgia Trio, sturm und drang (nwog)
2012 Nils Wogram Septet, complete soul (nwog)
2013 Nils Wogram Root 70 with Strings, riomar (nwog)
2014 Nils Wogram vertigo trombone quartet, developing good habits (nwog)

References

External links
Official site

1972 births
German women composers
German jazz trombonists
Male trombonists
Living people
CIMP artists
21st-century trombonists
21st-century German male musicians
German male jazz musicians